Every Day Isn't Sunday (German: Alle Tage ist kein Sonntag) is a 1959 West German comedy film directed by Helmut Weiss and starring Elisabeth Müller, Paul Hubschmid and Dietmar Schönherr. The title refers to a traditional song by Carl Clewing which features in the film. 

The film's sets were designed by the art directors Willi Herrmann and Karl Schneider. It was made at the Tempelhof Studios in West Berlin with location shooting also taking place around Freiburg im Breisgau in the Black Forest.

Plot 
While Eva is in the hospital after an accident, her son, Peter, goes in search of his long-missing father. Learning he has died, Peter then prepares himself for the new man in his mother's life.

Cast
 Elisabeth Müller as Eva Kende
 Paul Hubschmid as Karl Brandtstetter
 Dietmar Schönherr as Mitja Burganoff
 Jochen Hanke as Peter
 Jürgen Hanke as Paul
 Trude Herr as Fanny Knöbel
 Ralf Wolter as Dienstmann Huber
 Walter Janssen as Franz, Diener bei Brandtstelter
 Christa Williams as Barsängerin
 Jur Arten as Wladimir
 Rolf Weih as Gregor
 Hans Leibelt as Dr. Börger
 Cora Roberts as Olga
 Kurt Pratsch-Kaufmann as Mann mit Waldhorn
 Stanislav Ledinek as Agent Pacher
 Blandine Ebinger as Frau Hertel
 Willy Millowitsch as Mann mit Bombardon

References

Bibliography
 James L. Limbacher. Haven't I seen you somewhere before?: Remakes, sequels, and series in motion pictures and television, 1896-1978. Pierian Press, 1979.

External links 
 

1959 films
1959 comedy films
German comedy films
West German films
1950s German-language films
Films directed by Helmut Weiss
German black-and-white films
Films shot at Tempelhof Studios
1950s German films